This article shows the history of Hong Kong clubs participating in the AFC Cup.

Participations

Remarks:
1 Sun Hei competed in the 2006 AFC Cup under the team name Xiangxue Sun Hei.
2 Tai Po competed in the 2010 AFC Cup under the team name NT Realty Wofoo Tai Po.

Club statistics

Citizen

Results summary

Results

Eastern

Results summary

Results

Happy Valley

Results summary

Results

Kitchee

Results summary

Results

South China

Results summary

Results

Sun Hei

Results summary

Results

Remarks:
1 The match was abandoned after 65 minutes of play as Persibo Bojonegoro failed to reach the required limit of players on pitch. Sunray Cave JC Sun Hei were leading 8–0. The result was declared final by AFC.

Tai Po

Results summary

Results

TSW Pegasus

Results summary

Results

Lee Man

Results summary

Results

References

Football clubs in the AFC Cup